The 1992 United States Senate special election in California took place on November 3, 1992, at the same time as the regular election to the United States Senate in California. Feinstein defeated future California governor Gray Davis in the Democratic primary, while Seymour defeated William E. Dannemeyer in the Republican primary.

In this special election to complete the unexpired term of Republican Pete Wilson, who resigned to become Governor of California, incumbent Republican Senator John Seymour was defeated by former San Francisco Mayor Dianne Feinstein, whom Wilson defeated in the 1990 gubernatorial election. Feinstein subsequently held seniority over fellow Democrat Barbara Boxer, who was elected on the same day; because Feinstein was elected to complete an unexpired term, she took office on November 4, only 1 day after the election, while Boxer's term commenced with the beginning of the next session of Congress in January 1993. These elections marked the first time in history that two women simultaneously served in the Senate from the same state.

Background
The seat became vacant after incumbent Republican U.S. Senator Pete Wilson won the 1990 gubernatorial election, defeating Democrat Dianne Feinstein. Wilson appointed John Seymour to the Senate to replace himself.

Democratic primary

Candidates
Joseph Alioto
Gray Davis, California State Controller
Dianne Feinstein, former Mayor of San Francisco (1978–88) and nominee for Governor in 1990
David Kearns

Results

Republican primary

Candidates
William B. Allen, former Chair of the United States Commission on Civil Rights and candidate for Senator in 1986 and Governor in 1990
William E. Dannemeyer, U.S. Representative from Fullerton
John Seymour, incumbent U.S. Senator since January 1991 (appointed by Governor Pete Wilson)
Jim Trinity, retired Glendale dentist

Results

General election

Results

By county

See also
 1992 United States Senate elections
 1992 United States Senate election in California

References

External links
 JoinCalifornia 1992 Special Election

1992 special
California special
California 1992
United States Senate special
California
United States Senate 1992